John Joseph Houlihan (March 25, 1923 – July 24, 2003) was an American politician and businessman.

Houlihan was born in Chicago, Illinois, and went to the Chicago parochial and public schools. He graduated from Leo Catholic High School. He was in the United States Marine Corp during World War II in the Pacific and was badly wounded; one of his legs had to be amputated. He went to the Englewood Evening School and DePaul University. Houlihan was involved in the insurance business and with the AFL–CIO labor movement. He lived with his wife and family in Forest Park, Illinois. Houlihan sat in the Illinois House of Representatives from 1965 to 1973 and was a Democrat. He died from lung cancer at his home in Palos Heights, Illinois.

Notes

1923 births
2003 deaths
Businesspeople from Chicago
Politicians from Chicago
People from Forest Park, Illinois
Military personnel from Illinois
DePaul University alumni
Democratic Party members of the Illinois House of Representatives
Deaths from cancer in Illinois
Deaths from lung cancer
United States Marine Corps personnel of World War II